NA-214 Umerkot is a constituency for the National Assembly of Pakistan.

Members of Parliament

2018-2022: NA-220 Umerkot

Election 2002 

General elections were held on 10 Oct 2002. Nawab Muhammad Yousif Talpur of PPP won by 58,161 votes.

Election 2008 

General elections were held on 18 Feb 2008. Nawab Muhammad Yousif Talpur of PPP won by 75,080 votes.

Election 2013 

General elections were held on 11 May 2013. Nawab Muhammad Yousif Talpur of PPP won by 99,700 votes and became the  member of National Assembly.

Election 2013 

General elections were held on 11 May 2013. Pir Shafqat Hussain Shah Jilani of PPP won by 82,017 votes and became the  member of National Assembly.

Election 2018 

General elections were held on 25 July 2018.

See also
NA-213 Mirpur Khas-II
NA-215 Tharparkar-I

References

External links 
Election result's official website

NA-228